Dan Knodl (December 14, 1958) is an American politician, currently serving as a member of the Wisconsin State Assembly.

Early life and education 
Born in Milwaukee, Knodl was raised in Menomonee Falls, Wisconsin and graduated from Menomonee Falls East High School in 1977. He briefly attended the University of Wisconsin–Madison.

Career 
Knodl was elected to the Wisconsin State Assembly in 2008. He previously served on the Washington County Board of Supervisors.

On January 5, 2021, Knodl and 14 other Wisconsin lawmakers signed a letter to then-Vice President Mike Pence asking him to delay certification of the 2020 United States presidential election.  In the letter, they claimed, falsely, "The 2020 election witnessed an unprecedented and admitted defiance of state law and procedural irregularities raising questions about the validity of hundreds of thousands of ballots."

On December 2, 2022, Knodl announced that he was running in the special election for the 8th state senate district after incumbent Alberta Darling resigned. On February 21, 2023, Knodl beat Janel Brandtjen and Van Mobley in the Republican primary race. He will face Democrat Jodi Habush Sinynkin on the 4th of April.

References

People from Menomonee Falls, Wisconsin
People from Germantown, Wisconsin
Republican Party members of the Wisconsin State Assembly
1958 births
Living people
21st-century American politicians